Rubalcaba is a surname. Notable people with the surname include:

People
Alexis Rubalcaba (born 1972), Cuban amateur boxer, 1999 Pan American Games gold medalist
Alfredo Pérez Rubalcaba (1951–2019), Deputy Prime Minister of Spain and Secretary General of the PSOE
Gonzalo Rubalcaba (born 1963), Cuban jazz pianist and composer
Guillermo Rubalcaba (1927–2015), Cuban pianist, leader of Charanga Rubalcaba
Jacobo Rubalcaba (1895–1960), Cuban trombonist, composer and bandleader
Mario Rubalcaba (born 1972), Mexican American rock drummer, also known as Ruby Mars
Garrett Rubalcaba (Roman Heart, Linc Madison; 1986–2019), gay pornographic actor

Places
 Rubalcaba, Cantabria, Spain

Surnames of Spanish origin